There are at least 27 features in the U.S. state of Oregon currently or formerly named Blue Lake:

See also 
 List of lakes in Oregon

Lakes of Oregon